Ben & Izzy is a Jordanian three-dimensional, computer animated children's television series. It was produced by Jordan's rising educational and CGI animation company Rubicon. This series follows the adventures and developing friendship of two pre-teenaged boys known as Ben and Izzy, who are from the United States and Jordan respectively, as well as a desert genie known as Yasmine, who takes the form of a young girl closely resembling the age of the boys.

Despite the fact the series was produced in Jordan, it was primarily released in English for international purposes before its official Arabic dub in 2008. The series was created primarily to entertain, but it was also created as an educative experience about certain aspects of Arab history, and how it affected Western culture, which is also the forming of the bond between the Western Ben and the Eastern/Arab Izzy. This in turn represents a comprehensible and possible union of Western and Eastern/Arab cultures, in spite of the current prejudice views of each culture in the other. There are currently 13 episodes created, although 26 were originally planned.

Story 
The three of them soon realize that with their respective talents combined, they become the dream team, preserving history and saving the world!

Episode guide

Season 1 
Ben, Izzy and Yasmine get to know each other and explore many countries in the Middle East, looking for precious artifacts that were lost in time. Thanks to her genie powers, Yasmine whisks the boys to different times and lands to beat Clutchford Wells, whose sole interest is to sell the artifacts with no regard to how it would alter world history.

(2010)

Characters 
Designed by Yazan Khalifeh:
Ben: an 11-year-old American sports fan
Izzy: an 11-year-old Arab Jordanian boy who loves technology
Yasmine: a young genie with amazing powers
Prof. Jake Martin: Ben's grandfather and feisty archeologist
Prof. Omar Aziz: Izzy's spry grandfather, a scholar and a wiry man
Clutchford Wells: a greedy millionaire seeking nothing but material gain
Roxanne: Wells's mute assistant

Voices

English 
Lucy Liu - Yasmine

Arabic 
Hisham Hamadeh - Wells
Rania Fahed

References

External links 

  (Archive)
 Rubicon Animation Studios' website
 
 

Jordanian animated television series
Jordanian children's television series
2006 Jordanian television series debuts
2000s Jordanian television series
2000s animated television series
Animated television series about children
Children's animated television series
Children's education television series
Computer-animated television series
Television series by MGM Television